Billbergia formosa is a species of flowering plant in the genus Billbergia. It is endemic to Peru but cultivated elsewhere as an ornamental. The species is very rare in the wild and listed as endangered.

Cultivars
 Billbergia 'Caroliniana'
 Billbergia 'Wallonia'

References

formosa
Endemic flora of Peru
Plants described in 1907
Endangered flora of South America